Ella Shohat (Hebrew: אלה חביבה שוחט; Arabic: إيلا حبيبة شوحيط), (August 28, 1959, Israel - )  is a professor of cultural studies at New York University, where she teaches in the departments of Art & Public Policy and Middle Eastern & Islamic Studies.

Background and Writings

Arab-Jewish identity
Ella Shohat's parents were Iraqi Jews who emigrated to Israel in the 1950s. Shohat describes herself as an "Arab-Jew" and "Iraqi-Jew". Some of Shohat's writing deals with Arab-Jewish identity within the context of the Arab-Israeli conflict. She described her childhood in Israel in the 1960s as a time when children were "recruited for the making of a new identity that was to clash with our parents' Iraqiness, Arabness and Middle Easterness". Shohat's grandparents never learned Hebrew and her parents lamented how "in Iraq [...] we were Jews. In Israel, we are Arabs". Her father and his friends were told to stop speaking Arabic in the workplace and Shohat herself recalls similar messages being communicated to children at school. She described herself and other schoolchildren as "unknowing targets of mental colonization [...] [who] were expected to delete [...] the past across the border [and] also the transplanted Baghdads, Cairos or Rabats of our homes and neighbourhoods". Shohat felt that this process was part of "disciplining, corrective, normalizing machine" designed to make them "proud Israelis".

Media
Shohat has also written extensively on Israeli and Western media.

Reception 
In a review for the academic journal Biography, Egyptian Jewish professor Joyce Zonana described Shohat's book On the Arab Jew, Palestine and Other Displacements as a "profound work" and a "visionary contribution to (multi)cultural studies" which provides "helpful new ways of thinking about identity, politics, and culture in the Middle East and beyond". Zonana compared Shohat to Edward Said and Frantz Fanon, who she named as the only other writers whose "cultural/political analyses are so explicitly and productively rooted in their lives" in the way Shohat's work also is. Zonana further argued that Shohat had "honoured" Said and Fanon with this collection of writings. The essays "Sephardim in Israel: Zionism from the Standpoint of Its Jewish Victims" and "Dislocated Identities: Reflections of an Arab Jew" were described as "canonical" and "groundbreaking".

The journal Mashriq & Mahjar also praised On the Arab Jew, Palestine and Other Displacements. In the review, Professor Jennifer L. Kelly described the book as "required reading for scholars working at the intersection of critical refugee studies, comparative colonial studies, and feminist studies". Kelly noted that Shohat "constructs meaningful parallels between dislocated Arab-Jews and displaced Palestinians with the establishment of the Israeli state in 1948" in order to "point to the multiple violences that animate life in the wake of occupation and exile".

On the Arab Jew, Palestine and Other Displacements was the winner of the Middle East Monitor Palestine Book Award 2017 for Memoir.

Publications

Books

 Colonialité et Ruptures: Écrits sur les figures juives arabes, Essays selected and introduced by Joelle Marelli & Tal Dor, and translated into French by Marelli, Lux Éditeur, Canada, 2021. 
On the Arab-Jew, Palestine, and Other Displacements: Selected Writings of Ella Shohat. London, Pluto Press, 2017.
 Between the Middle East and the Americas: The Cultural Politics of Diaspora (coedited with E. Alsultany), The University of Michigan Press, 2013. Honorable Mention in the Non-Fiction category for the Arab American Book Award, The Arab American Museum.
 Race in Translation: Culture Wars around the Postcolonial Atlantic (coauthored with R. Stam), New York University Press, 2012.
 Flagging Patriotism: Crises of Narcissism and Anti-Americanism (co-authored with Robert Stam).
 Le sionisme du point de vue de ses victimes juives: les juifs orientaux en Israel (first published in 1988, with a new introduction, Paris; La Fabrique Editions, 2006).
Taboo Memories, Diasporic Voices (Duke University Press, 2006).
Multiculturalism, Postcoloniality and Transnational Media (coedited, Rutgers Univ. Press, 2003).
Zikhronot Asurim (Hebrew, Forbidden Reminiscences, Bimat Kedem LeSifrut with the Alternative Information Center, 2001). 
Talking Visions: Multicultural Feminism in a Transnational Age. (MIT & The New Museum of Contemporary Art, 1998).
Dangerous Liaisons: Gender, Nation, and Postcolonial Perspectives (Co-edited with McClintock, Anne & Amir Mufti), University of Minnesota Press, 1997.
Unthinking Eurocentrism: Multiculturalism and the Media (coauthored with Robert Stam, 1994), 20th Anniversary 2nd Edition, with a new Afterward Chapter, “Thinking about Unthinking: Twenty Years After” (1-73 pp.) London: Routledge, 2014. Katherine Kovacs Singer Best Film Book Award for 1994.
Israeli Cinema: East/West and the Politics of Representation (Univ. of Texas Press, 1989), 20th Anniversary Edition with a New Postscript Chapter, London, I.B. Tauris, 2010.

Articles
 "Disorienting Cleopatra: A Modern Trope of Identity" in The Black in the Mediterranean Blue: The Anniversary Issue, Transition, No. 132, 2021, pp. 148-169.
 "The Invention of Judeo-Arabic", Interventions: International Journal of Postcolonial Studies, Routledge, Vol. 19, Issue 2, 2017, pp. 153–200.
 "Lost Homelands, Imaginary Returns: The Exilic Literature of Iranian and Iraqi Jews", in Moments of Silence: Authenticity in the Cultural Expressions of the Iran-Iraq War (1980-1988), Arta Khakpour, Mohammad Mehdi Khorrami & Shouleh Vatanabadi, eds. New York University Press, 2016, pp. 20–58.
 "The Question of Judeo-Arabic(s): Itineraries of Belonging", in Languages of Modern Jewish Cultures: Comparative Perspectives, Joshua Miller and Anita Norich, eds. University of Michigan Press, 2016, pp. 94–149.
 "The Specter of the Blackamoor: Figuring Africa and the Orient", in Re-Significations: European Blackamoors, Africana Reading, edited by Awam Amkpa. Rome: Postcart SRL, 2016.
 "A Voyage to Toledo: 25 Years After the ‘Jews of the Orient and Palestinians’ Meetin", Jadaliyya, Sept. 30, 2014.
 "The Question of Judeo-Arabic" Opening Essay, Arab Studies Journal, 23:1 (Fall 2015), pp 14-76.
 "Remembering a Baghdad Elsewhere: An Emotional Cartography", Biography, 37:3 (Summer 2014), pp. 784-790
 "The Sephardi-Moorish Atlantic: Between Orientalism and Occidentalism", in Between the Middle East and the Americas: The Cultural Politics of Diaspora, edited by Ella Habiba Shohat and Evelyn Azeeza Alsultany. Ann Arbor: University of Michigan Press, 2013.
 "Transnationalizing Comparison: The Uses and Abuses of Cross-Cultural Analogy" (with R. Stam), Special focus, “Comparison,” New Literary History, 40: 3 (Summer 2009), pp. 473-499.
 "The ‘Postcolonial’ in Translation: Reading Said in Hebrew" (a special issue on Edward Said, edited by Rashid Khalidi,) Journal of Palestine Studies, XXXIII, no. 3 (Spring 2004), pp. 55-75.
 "The Shaping of Mizrahi Studies: A Relational Approach", Israel Studies Forum, Vol. 17, No. 2, (Spring 2002): 86-93.
 "Notes on the" Post-Colonial", Social Text 31/32 (1992): 99-113.
 "Rethinking Jews and Muslims: Quincentennial Reflections", Middle East Report, no. 178 (1992): 25-29.
 "Dislocated Identities: Reflections of an Arab Jew", Movement Research: Performance Journal # 5 (Fall Winter, 1992). Segments from Ella Shohat’s essay are included in Elia Suleiman's New York-based film Homage by Assassination (1992).
 "Sephardim in Israel: Zionism from the standpoint of its Jewish victims", Social Text, 19/20 (1988): 1-35.

Edited special issues
 “Edward Said: A Memorial Issue” (coedited with Patrick Deer and Gyan Prakash), Social Text 87 (Summer 2006) pp. 1–144.
 “Corruption in Corporate Culture” (coedited with Randy Martin), Social Text 77 (Winter 2003) pp. 1–153
 “Palestine in a Transnational Context” (coedited with Timothy Mitchell & Gyan Prakash), Social Text 75 (Summer 2003) pp. 1–162
 “911-A Public Emergency?” (co-edited with Brent Edwards, Stefano Harney, Randy Martin, Timothy Mitchell, Fred Moten), Social Text 72 (Fall 2002), pp. 1–199

Participation in films
 Samir, Forget Baghdad: Jews and Arabs – The Iraqi Connection Switzerland 2002.  Documentary. (The film is the Winner of  Best Documentary, Swiss Film Prize;  And  of the Critics Week Award, Locarno International Film Festival.
Interview for a DVD Documentaries on Rambo III, Afghanistan: Land of Crisis and Guts and Glory, produced by Laura Nix, Artisan Home Entertainment, 2002.
Commentary/Interviewee, Fresh Blood, Video Essay by b.h. Yael, Canada, 1996.
 Contributor to script and voice over reading for Elia Suleiman's film Homage by Assassination (28 min) 1992. 
Elia Suleiman's film incorporates a few segments from Shohat's article, written during the 1990-91 Gulf War. Shohat & Suleiman rewrote the segments as a letter from Ella Habiba Shohat to her friend Elia Suleiman. As Suleiman receives the faxed letter, Shohat is heard in a voice-over reading from "Reflections of an Arab-Jew."

References

External links
 Professor Ella Shohat, faculty page, Department of Art & Public Policy, Tisch School of the Arts, New York University
https://nyu.academia.edu/EllaShohat, Academia page.

1959 births
Living people
Israeli Arab feminists
Israeli Arab writers
Arab Israeli anti-racism activists
City University of New York faculty
Cultural academics
Israeli Arabic-language writers
Israeli Arab Jews
Israeli expatriates in the United States
Israeli people of Iraqi-Jewish descent
Jewish historians
Jewish writers
Jewish philosophers
Judeo-Arabic writers
Mizrahi feminists
New York University alumni
New York University faculty
Israeli Sephardi Jews
Israeli Mizrahi Jews